Warszawa Ursus railway station is a railway station in the Ursus district of Warsaw, Poland.  The station is served by Koleje Mazowieckie, who run trains from Skierniewice to Warszawa Wschodnia, and Szybka Kolej Miejska, who run trains from Pruszków PKP to Otwock. The station was opened in 1926 as Ursus. It was changed to its current name in 1977 when Ursus became part of Warsaw.

References

External links 
 
Station article at kolej.one.pl

Railway stations in Poland opened in 1926
Ursus
Railway stations served by Koleje Mazowieckie
Railway stations served by Szybka Kolej Miejska (Warsaw)
Ursus, Warsaw